Alfonso Rodríguez (born 5 January 1957, in Ciudad Trujillo, Dominican Republic) is a Dominican director, producer, writer, actor and aspiring presidential candidate for the 2020 elections in the Dominican Republic.

Biography
Graduated from the Universidad Autonoma de Santo Domingo (UASD) and in 1979 he studied TV and films production in the University of California, Irvine. His first works where as a Head Colorist in Color System Tech where he colored classic B/W movies such as Miracle on 34th Street, The Maltese Falcon, and Alfred Hitchcock Presents, among others. He returned to Dominican Republic and started to work as a director of production in several prestigious TV stations where he started to make TV movies, sitcoms and soap operas.

In 1988 Rodríguez makes his first feature film "Trafico de Niños", and then the hit soap opera Cadena Braga. Along with his popular sitcoms (Ciudad Nueva, Electrolocos y Pobre Presidente), he makes "Grandes Series Dominicanas", 10 Mini Series of 5 one-hour episodes. In 2003 and 2004 he makes the TV Movies "Jarabe de Mar" I, II and III and in 2006 the hit romantic comedy "Un Macho de Mujer". His latest work, "Yuniol" is his most beloved work, and got excellent reviews from national and international critics.

Filmography
 En altamar (2018)
 Pulso (2018)
 Luis (2017)
 El encuentro (2017)
 Ladrones (2015)
 Morir soñando (2015)
 Locas y atrapadas (2014)
 Ponchao (2013)
 Noche de circo (2013)
 Mi angelito favorito (2013)
 Lotoman 2.0 (2012)
 Feo de día, lindo de noche (2012)
 Pimp Bullies (2011)
 Lotoman (2011)
 Jaque mate (2011)
 La soga (2009)
 Al fin y al cabo (2008)
 Playball (2008)
 Trópico (2007)
 Yuniol 2 (2007)
 Un macho de mujer (2006)
 La fiesta del Chivo (2005)
 Cadena Braga (1991)
 Tráfico de niños (1988)

Presidential aspirations 
On Tuesday night of July 24, filmmaker Alfonso Rodríguez formally announced his aspirations for the country's presidency for the period 2020–2024.

"I can no longer sit in my house watching how they destroy my country, the country where I was born, the only country in the world where I am not discriminated against and where I am not an immigrant, the country that was once the ideal to raise my children. Because I can not remain silent without doing anything while corruption leads my country to total collapse in all aspects, "said Alfonso, expressing the reasons for his interest in governing the country.

In the company of his three daughters, Rodriguez explained that his aspiration to the Presidency of the Dominican Republic is not a leap into the void or something that came to him overnight. "I have been thinking about this for many years and for three years I have been talking with many people about this project, which I have called the Democratic Revolution".

He clarified that his presidential candidacy project has nothing to do with any movement of the left.

When asked about who would accompany him on his political platform, he said that many people have already called him to offer his support, but that little by little he will announce the names of those who will join him.

The film producer announced that there is a medium size political party and two small parties that have been interested in his project of Democratic Revolution 2020, but that he would only accept as long as in that party, primary votes are held first and then the candidate who wins will run.

To keep accounts clear from the first day, Alfonso Rodríguez made public his declaration of assets of 191 million Dominican pesos.

The actor also said that he will not leave aside his role as producer and film director, because he maintains that he is not going to live off politics.

"I'm never going to abandon my job and my profession as a filmmaker, because I do not enter politics to live on it. I'm going to continue making films, in fact, on September 6 I start with my next movie."

He added that "because politics also requires a lot of time, maybe my work will be a little bit worse, but I will never leave it abandoned."

References

External links
 

1957 births
Living people
Dominican Republic film directors
Dominican Republic film producers
Dominican Republic male film actors
Dominican Republic male television actors
Dominican Republic screenwriters
Dominican Republic male writers
Male screenwriters
Dominican Republic television directors
Dominican Republic television producers
People from Santo Domingo
Dominican Republic people of Spanish descent